Micah Franklin (born May 19, 1972) is an American former professional baseball outfielder. He played part of one season in Major League Baseball with the St. Louis Cardinals in 1997. Franklin also played in Nippon Professional Baseball in Japan during the 1999 and 2000 seasons, and in the Korea Baseball Organization in 2002 and 2003.

Early life
Franklin was born in San Francisco, California, attended Lincoln High School in San Francisco, and is Jewish. His mother is Jewish and his father was African-American.

Career
Franklin was drafted by the New York Mets in the 3rd round of the 1990 amateur draft. Although he only appeared in 17 games at the major league level, Franklin compiled an extensive minor league baseball career, playing 1,141 games over 12 seasons. In the majors he batted .324/.378/.500.

While in the minors with the Triple-A Indianapolis Indians in 2001, Franklin was one of four players profiled in the documentary film A Player to Be Named Later. He spent time a scout for the Arizona Diamondbacks.

Coaching 
In , Franklin was a Major League scout working for the Seattle Mariners.

On December 6, 2017, he was announced as the new hitting coach for the Arizona Diamondbacks Short Season A-Ball affiliate, Hillsboro Hops. A year later, he was promoted to the single-A Kane County Cougars in the same position.

In , Franklin was hired as the hitting coach for the Washington Nationals AA affiliate, Harrisburg Senators.

References

External links

Career statistics and player information from Korea Baseball Organization

1972 births
Living people
African-American baseball coaches
African-American baseball players
African-American Jews
American expatriate baseball players in Canada
American expatriate baseball players in Japan
American expatriate baseball players in South Korea
Arizona Diamondbacks scouts
Baseball coaches from California
Baseball players from San Francisco
Billings Mustangs players
Birmingham Barons players
Calgary Cannons players
Charleston Wheelers players
Chattanooga Lookouts players
Erie Sailors players
Hanshin Tigers players
Hyundai Unicorns players
Indianapolis Indians players
Iowa Cubs players
Jewish American baseball coaches
Jewish American baseball players
Jewish Major League Baseball players
KBO League infielders
Kingsport Mets players
Louisville Redbirds players
Major League Baseball outfielders
Minor league baseball coaches
Nippon Ham Fighters players
Pittsfield Mets players
Seattle Mariners scouts
St. Louis Cardinals players
Toledo Mud Hens players
Tucson Sidewinders players
Winston-Salem Spirits players
21st-century African-American sportspeople
21st-century American Jews
20th-century African-American sportspeople